Hera or Hera Hiding During the Battle Between the Gods and the Giants is a c.1643 oil on canvas painting by Carel Fabritius, produced during his apprenticeship in Rembrandt's studio or shortly afterwards. It is now in the Pushkin Museum in Moscow.

Title
Its present title was given in a 2004 catalogue of the Museum's collections due to the peacocks (Hera's birds), with the longer version referring to her being sent to Oceanus's and Tethys' home by her mother Rhea during the Titanomachy, though it is unclear if that interpretation is correct, as it would not explain why she is interrupted at coming her hair and why she does not appear to be near the ocean. In 1883 it was thought to be Narcissus, though this would not explain the peacocks, the running quadruped and why the figure looks up from the water rather than gazes at their reflection.

Bibliography 
  Duparc, F.J., 2004, Carel Fabritius (1622-1654). Zijn leven en zijn werk, in: Carel Fabritius, 1622-1654, Zwolle, Waanders, p. 33-34
  Seelig, G. & Suchtelen, A. van, 2004, Catalogus, in: Carel Fabritius, 1622-1654, Zwolle, Waanders, p. 91-94 (cat. 3)
 Duparc, F.J., 2006, "Results of the Recent Art-Historical and Technical Research on Carel Fabritius's Early Work", Oud Holland 119 (2006), p. 76-89

1643 paintings
Paintings by Carel Fabritius
Paintings in the collection of the Pushkin Museum
Paintings of Hera